Kinuachdrachd or Kinuachdrach is a place about 22 miles from Craighouse on the island of Jura, in the council area of Argyll and Bute, Scotland. It comprises a house west of the Aird of Kinuachdrachd. On the 1982 OS 1:10000 map there were 4 buildings.

History 
The name "Kinuachdrach" means "Upper end". It once served as a crossing point to Scarba and the mainland. For most of the 19th century Kinuachdrach had a relatively sizable population.

References 

Hamlets in Argyll and Bute
Villages on Jura, Scotland